Lê Hiển Tông (黎顯宗 20 May 1717 – 10 August 1786), born Lê Duy Diêu, was the penultimate emperor of Vietnamese Lê dynasty. He reigned from 1740 to 1786 and was succeeded by his grandson Lê Duy Kỳ.

At the time Vietnam was under the power of the Trịnh lords. During the reigns of Lê Thuần Tông (1732–35) and Lê Ý Tông (1735–40), Trịnh Giang ruled Vietnam with the title Uy Nam Vương, but he was deposed in 1740 due to poor leadership. From 1740 to 1767, Trịnh Doanh ruled with the title Minh Do Vương in the first part of the reign of Lê Hiển Tông. He was followed by Trịnh Sâm, who ruled from 1767 to 1782 with the title Tinh Do Vương. At this point the Lê dynasty began to regain its power.

Issue
He had twenty-three children, including:
 Crown prince Lê Duy Vĩ, executed by the Trịnh lords in 1771
 Lê Duy Cận (died after 1786)
 Princess Lê Thị Ngọc Hân
 Princess Lê Thị Ngọc Bình

References

Sources
 
 
                                               

Hien Tong
1717 births
1786 deaths
18th-century Vietnamese monarchs
Vietnamese monarchs